Zofia Moraczewska, née Gostkowska (4 July 1873 – 16 November 1958) was a Polish politician and women's rights activist.

Life
Zofia Moraczewska was born of 4 July 1873 in Czernowitz, Duchy of Bukovina, Austro-Hungarian Empire (now Chernivtsi, Ukraine) and graduated from the Teacher's Seminary in Lemberg, the capital of the Kingdom of Galicia and Lodomeria in the Austro-Hungarian Empire (now Lviv, Ukraine), in 1893. She married Jędrzej Moraczewski three years later and joined the Social Democratic Party of Galicia ( (GPS) or ) that same year. They had four children between 1901 and 1907, although the youngest did not survive infancy. Her husband was elected to the House of Deputies of the Imperial Council in 1907, representing Stryj (now Stryi, Ukraine), and became the first Prime Minister of the Second Polish Republic for several months in 1918–19. Moraczewska was elected a member of the Sejm and was an editor for the Voice of Women, the official newspaper of the Polish Socialist Party's (the renamed GPS) Women's Department from 1919 to 1927. One of her sons died in 1920 during the Polish–Soviet War, her husband in 1944 and her two surviving children were killed in the Auschwitz concentration camp during World War II. She died on 16 November 1958 in her home in Sulejówek.

Activities
Once the couple settled in Stryj, Moraczewska founded the Women's Association, which started a school for working women and several cooperatives. She joined the Women's League of Silezia and Galicia in 1915, after the start of World War I.

Notes

References

1873 births
1958 deaths
Polish women's rights activists
Politicians from Chernivtsi
People from the Duchy of Bukovina
Polish Austro-Hungarians
Polish socialist feminists
20th-century Polish women politicians
Members of the Legislative Sejm of the Second Polish Republic
Members of the Sejm of the Second Polish Republic (1930–1935)
Nonpartisan Bloc for Cooperation with the Government politicians
Officers of the Order of Polonia Restituta